WDGG (93.7 FM) is a country music–formatted radio station licensed to Ashland, Kentucky, United States, serving Huntington, West Virginia and the greater Huntington–Ashland metropolitan area. The station is owned by Kindred Communications as part of a conglomerate with Huntington–licensed ESPN Radio–affiliated sports station WRVC (930 AM),  Huntington–licensed ESPN Radio–affiliated sports station WCMI (1340 AM), Catlettsburg, Kentucky–licensed active rock station WCMI-FM (92.7 FM), Kenova, West Virginia–licensed adult contemporary station WMGA (97.9 FM), and Gallipolis, Ohio–licensed classic country station WXBW (101.5 FM). All six stations share studios on Fifth Avenue in downtown Huntington, while its transmitter facilities off of Park Avenue near I-64 in southwestern Huntington.

In addition to its country music format, WDGG serves as the flagship station for the Marshall Thundering Herd.

History
The station signed on the air in October 1948 as WCMI-FM in Ashland as a simulcast of its AM sister station WCMI's broadcast schedule. The call letters were said to refer to the steel industry of Ashland as "Where Coal Meets Iron".

On November 20, 1970, the call letters were changed to WAMX-FM and ownership was transferred to W. Richard Martin and Stereo 94, Inc. The station broadcast with an adult contemporary music format and experimented with an album oriented rock format at night during the early 1970s.

In the mid-1970s, WAMX-FM (also known as 94X) adopted a contemporary hit radio (CHR) format until its sale to Storer broadcasting in 1983. With the sale, the studios moved to nearby Huntington, and the station adopted an album oriented rock format (AOR). 

On April 30, 1988, the call letters representing the River Cities were adopted and the license became known as WRVC-FM. The dormant WAMX call sign was adopted by an unrelated station (at 106.3 MHz) in the Huntington market on January 6, 1997. 

In the fall of 1992, they changed the format to oldies (mostly concentrating on the 60s), and changed the tag to "Oldies 93 RVC".

The WDGG call letters were granted by the FCC on February 6, 1995.   At this time, the WRVC call sign and oldies format were moved to 92.7 WCMI-FM, which continued the simulcast with WRVZ in Charleston.

References

External links
The Dawg WDGG official website
FCC Database Return for WDGG

History of WCMI

DGG
Country radio stations in the United States
Ashland, Kentucky
1948 establishments in Kentucky
Radio stations established in 1948